Pierre Gaspard-Huit (29 November 1917 – 1 May 2017) was a French film director and screenwriter. He directed the 1963 film Shéhérazade, which starred Anna Karina.  He was once married to actress Claudine Auger when she was 18, and he was 41 years old. She acted in several of his films.

Filmography
 La Vie tragique d'Utrillo (1949)
 L'Herbe à la Reyne (1951)
 La Fugue de Monsieur Perle (1952) (co-directed with Roger Richebé)
 The Little Czar (1954)
 Sophie et le Crime (1955)
 Maid in Paris (1956)
 The Bride Is Much Too Beautiful (1956)
 Les Lavandières du Portugal (1957)
 Christine (1958)
 Captain Fracasse (1961)
 Shéhérazade (1963)
 Gibraltar (1964)
 Living It Up (1966)
 The Last of the Mohicans (1968) (co-directed with Jean Dréville and Sergiu Nicolaescu)

References

External links

1917 births
2017 deaths
French film directors
French male screenwriters
French screenwriters
People from Libourne